Burnett Township is one of twenty-four townships in Antelope County, Nebraska. The population was 175 at the 2010 census. It was named for a railroad official.

See also
County government in Nebraska

References

External links
City-Data.com

Townships in Antelope County, Nebraska
Townships in Nebraska